Embarcadero Center is a commercial complex of five office towers, two hotels, a shopping center with more than 125 stores, bars, and restaurants, and a fitness center on three levels located in San Francisco, California. There is an outdoor ice skating rink during winter months. Embarcadero Center sits on a  site largely bounded by Clay Street (to the north), Sacramento Street (to the south), Battery Street (to the west), and the Embarcadero (to the east), in the financial district of San Francisco.

Developed by Trammell Crow, David Rockefeller and John Portman, construction began with Tower One in 1971, with the last off-complex extension, Embarcadero West, completed in 1989. The two extension buildings are west of Battery.

The 4.8 million square feet (445,900 m2) complex accommodates offices for 14,000 people along with mixed-use areas accommodating retail, dining, entertainment and cinema functions. The cinema’s operator closed its doors permanently in February 2022.

Structures

See also

 Embarcadero Station (BART)
 Vaillancourt Fountain
 Peachtree Center, Atlanta
 Renaissance Center, Detroit
 Westin Bonaventure Hotel, Los Angeles

References

Further reading

External links
 Official Embarcadero Center website
360 degree panoramic photographs of San Francisco's Embarcadero Center, from Don Bain's 360° Panoramas

Skyscrapers in San Francisco
Financial District, San Francisco
Twin towers
John C. Portman Jr. buildings
1971 establishments in California